North Quay, Western Australia, a container handling port in North Fremantle, Western Australia
 North Quay, Brisbane, an area of Brisbane, Australia
North Quay ferry wharf, a ferry terminal serving the Brisbane North Quay
 North Quay, London, a proposed building complex on Canary Wharf, London